An attaché is a person who is assigned ("attached") to the administrative staff of a superior, or to another service or agency.

Attaché may also refer to:

 A flash drive made by PNY Technologies
 A type of briefcase
 A wrestler in the Gorgeous Ladies of Wrestling federation
 A Mississippi show choir named Attaché Show Choir